The Collector's Series, Volume One is a primarily English-language compilation album by Canadian singer Celine Dion, released by Sony Music on 23 October 2000. The album was renamed Tout en amour (meaning All in Love) in France. It features "The Power of the Dream", the song that Dion performed during the opening ceremony of the 1996 Summer Olympics. The album has sold over three million copies worldwide.

Content
The Collector's Series, Volume One is a compilation of some of Dion's biggest hits and few rare tracks. The album features "The Power of the Dream" from the opening ceremony of the 1996 Summer Olympics, duets with Barbra Streisand and Andrea Bocelli, and few rarely heard non-English language songs. It also includes singles which were not issued on Dion's previous greatest hits album All the Way… A Decade of Song: "Where Does My Heart Beat Now", "Only One Road", "Falling into You", "Tell Him", and "The Reason".

Tout en amour was released in France also as a limited edition, including twelve colour postcards with previously unreleased photos of Dion. The album was re-released in October 2004 in few European countries, as part of the Best of the Best Gold series. The gold-disc pressing was housed in a die-cut slipcase, exposing the gold disc and featured the same tracks that graced the standard pressing.

Critical reception
According to Stephen Thomas Erlewine from AllMusic, The Collector's Series, Volume One filled the gaps left by Dion's hits collection, All the Way... A Decade of Song - the many duets, French and Spanish songs, and previously unheard in the US tracks. He wondered why it couldn't be nothing but rarities, which would have served them better than this "mixed bag".

Commercial performance
The Collector's Series, Volume One has sold over three million copies worldwide and topped chart in France, and reached top ten in Canada and Portugal.

In the United States, the album debuted at No. 28 on Billboard 200, selling 36,000 copies in its first week. According to Nielsen SoundScan, it has sold 914,000 copies in the US.

Track listing

Notes
  signifies a co-producer
  signifies an additional producer
  signifies an assistant producer
  signifies Italian translation
  signifies an additional vocal producer

Charts

Weekly charts

Year-end charts

Certifications and sales

Release history

References

External links
 

2000 compilation albums
Albums produced by Billy Steinberg
Albums produced by Christopher Neil
Albums produced by David Foster
Albums produced by Humberto Gatica
Albums produced by Jim Steinman
Albums produced by John Jones (record producer)
Albums produced by Max Martin
Albums produced by Ric Wake
Albums produced by Rick Nowels
Albums produced by Walter Afanasieff
Celine Dion compilation albums